The Tinicum Island Rear Range Light is a lighthouse located in  the Billingsport section of Paulsboro in Gloucester County, New Jersey, the rear of a pair of range lights marking a section of the channel in the Delaware River south of Philadelphia, Pennsylvania. The lighthouse, surrounded by ball fields next to the new marine terminal for the Port of Paulsboro, is still active for navigation on the Delaware River. It works in conjunction with the Tinicum Front Range Light, known as the Billingsport Front Light, situated on the banks of the Delaware River at the front of Fort Billings Park next to the Paulsboro Refinery.

Front and rear range lighthouses guide sailors who, by aligning the two lights and keeping one light on top of the other, stay in its center and avoid Little Tinicum Island as they travel upstream.

The Tinicum Island Range Lights were activated on New Year's Eve 1880. The lights were changed from oil to electric in 1917. The Coast Guard automated the lights in 1933. The dwelling buildings were demolished sometime in the 1950s after they fell into disrepair. The rear range lighthouse, which is owned by the United States Coast Guard, was added to the National Register of Historic Places on September 15, 2005.

Tinicum Rear Range Lighthouse Society offers regular tours, including a climb to the top of the tower, the third full weekend of each month from April through October and special tours with advance notice. Surrounding views from the lighthouse include Philadelphia and its airport.

References

External links

Lighthouses completed in 1880
Neoclassical architecture in New Jersey
Transportation buildings and structures in Gloucester County, New Jersey
Lighthouses on the National Register of Historic Places in New Jersey
National Register of Historic Places in Gloucester County, New Jersey
New Jersey Register of Historic Places
Paulsboro, New Jersey